Marc Paul Alain Dutroux (born 6 November 1956) is a Belgian convicted serial killer, serial rapist, and child molester. Initially convicted for the abduction and rape of five young girls in 1989, Dutroux was released on parole after just three years' imprisonment. He was arrested again in 1996 on suspicion of having abducted, tortured, and sexually abused six girls aged between 8 and 19, four of whom were killed. Dutroux's widely publicized trial ended with his conviction on all charges in 2004; he was subsequently sentenced to life imprisonment.

Dutroux's accomplices included his wife, Michelle Martin; Michel Lelièvre; Michel Nihoul; and Bernard Weinstein. Martin was convicted and sentenced to thirty years in prison, while Lelièvre was sentenced to twenty-five years. Nihoul, "a Brussels businessman, pub-owner and familiar face at sex parties," was initially tried as an accomplice to the kidnappings but was acquitted owing to insufficient evidence; he was instead convicted of involvement in a gang that participated in human and drug trafficking, and was sentenced to five years in prison. Weinstein was never tried as he was murdered by Dutroux.

The lenient result of Dutroux's first prosecution, as well as shortcomings on the part of the police in investigating his murders, caused widespread discontent in Belgium with the country's criminal justice system, resulting in the complete reorganisation of Belgium's law enforcement agencies. In the White March held on 20 October 1996, 300,000 Belgian citizens protested the mishandling of the case.

Early life 
Marc Dutroux was born in Ixelles, Brussels, on 6 November 1956 to Victor Dutroux and Jeanine Lauwens. He is the eldest of five children. Dutroux spent part of his early childhood in Burundi, then part of the Belgian Congo, where his father worked as a teacher. After Burundi gained independence in mid-1962, Dutroux's family moved back to Belgium and settled in the village of Obaix in Hainaut Province. Dutroux later reported to have been abused by his mother and father. 

In 1972, Dutroux's parents separated and his father left the family home. Shortly after graduating from school, Dutroux left home himself and made his living as an electrician. Several years later, in 1976, Dutroux married Françoise Dubois, with whom he had two children. The marriage was marred by Dutroux's abusive behavior towards his family; the couple would divorce in 1983, with Françoise keeping custody of the children.

Early criminal activity (1979-1989) 
During the late 1970s, Dutroux found new employment as a scrap dealer and supplemented his income by stealing car parts. From 1979 onward he would be convicted for a variety of petty offenses including assault, drug dealing, and trading stolen vehicles. Meanwhile he regularly visited ice skating rinks in Charleroi, Forest, and Montignies-sur-Sambre, where he would deliberately trip or bump into young female skaters in order to touch them. In October 1980, Dutroux visited a Charleroi skating rink and got into a physical altercation with another patron, Armand de Beyn, after repeatedly colliding with De Beyn's girlfriend. A court case ended with De Beyn being convicted of assault and battery against Dutroux, although Dutroux was banned from the Charleroi skating rink.

One of his mistresses was Michelle Martin, whom he later married and with whom he had three more children.

Initial rapes (1985-1989) 
On 14 December 1985, Dutroux abducted Axelle D. During her testimony, she told the police that Dutroux's accomplice Peteghem had told her that "he was part of a gang" led by two gang leaders, "an Italian and a crazy stupid one." Jean van Peteghem admitted to having taken part in the abduction. He said he had abducted Axelle D. with Marc Dutroux and Michelle Martin. He had lived with Dutroux after being discharged from the military and having his marriage fail. 

Peteghem told police that his and Dutroux's first victims were two girls from Morlanwelz. These two victims were never located by police. 

On 7 June 1985 the first proven abduction by the two took place, the abduction of eleven-year-old Sylvie D. On 17 October 1985 the pair abducted Maria V., 19, from Peronnes-lez-Binche. Maria V. also identified a third man who took part in her abduction and appeared to be in his fifties. This man was never found by police. On 17 January 1986 Catherine B., aged 18, was abducted from Obaix in Hainaut Province. Dutroux had one or two accomplices in her abduction who were never found by police. Peteghem was stationed as army personnel in Germany during that time and could not have assisted Dutroux.  

On 18 December 1985, Dutroux abducted Élisabeth G., 15, in Pont-à-Celles. Peteghem told police that Dutroux filmed Élisabeth naked and took pictures of her. At the beginning of February 1987, Martin, Dutroux and Peteghem were arrested. This had to a large extent been the fault of Peteghem, who had given out a lot of information about himself in conversations with the girls, which had been enough for police to identify him. The three were eventually convicted on 26 April 1989. Dutroux received 13 years. Peteghem received 6 years and Martin received 5 years. Dutroux received a harsher sentence because he had also committed several robberies with Peteghem. Dutroux was thus additionally convicted for the brutal robbery of a 58-year-old woman. The robbery was also committed with accomplices. One of the accomplices in this robbery was also never found by police.

The early release of Dutroux was granted by Melchior Wathelet, who was at that time the Belgian minister of justice; Dutroux's release was ordered against the advice of both the public prosecutor and the psychiatrist who had examined him in prison, who stated that Dutroux remained dangerous.

Granting Dutroux state assistance, sleeping pills and sedatives 
While in jail, Dutroux managed to convince a health professional that he was disabled due to mental illnesses. That way, he was able to collect public assistance consisting of $1,200 a month from the Belgium government. He also convinced the professionals that he needed sedatives for sleeping problems. Dutroux later went on to use them to sedate his victims. He owned seven small houses, most of them vacant, and used three of them for the torture of the girls he kidnapped. Although he owned several houses, his state assistance stipend was not reduced. In his residence in Marcinelle, he constructed a concealed dungeon in the basement. Dutroux has been described by psychiatrists who examined him for trial as a psychopath.

Crimes after release 

On 24 June 1995, eight-year-old classmates Julie Lejeune and Mélissa Russo were kidnapped after going for a walk in Grâce-Hollogne, probably by Dutroux, and brought to his house in Marcinelle. Dutroux kept them imprisoned in the dungeon he had created, repeatedly sexually abused them and produced pornographic videos of the abuse. Two months later, in the early hours of 23 August in Ostend, Dutroux and accomplice Michel Lelièvre kidnapped An Marchal and Eefje Lambrecks, two teenage girls from Hasselt who were on their way back to their holiday home in Westende following a night out in Blankenberge. With Lejeune and Russo already in the dungeon, Lambrecks and Marchal were kept in chains in a bedroom. In September, according to Martin, Lambrecks and Marchal were drugged and brought to Jumet, where Dutroux and accomplice Bernard Weinstein killed them by burying them alive.

Around the time of Lambrecks's and Marchal's deaths, Weinstein and a man named Philippe Divers stole a van and hid it in a hangar; after it was found there by the hangar's owner, it was taken away by the police. Dutroux and Weinstein suspected that Divers and his friend Pierre Rochow had betrayed them, and on the night of 4 November, wishing to interrogate them about the van, Dutroux and Weinstein lured Divers and Rochow into Weinstein's home in Jumet and drugged and sequestered them, before leaving to go to Rochow's house to search for clues about the van. There they found Rochow's girlfriend, Bénédicte Jadot, whom they took with them back to Jumet and questioned, before leaving again to pick up another person. While they were away, Jadot escaped and alerted a neighbour, who called the police. With Weinstein wanted by police, Dutroux decided to kill him to prevent his capture. He kidnapped Weinstein and held him in the dungeon at his house in Marcinelle between 13 and 20 November. During this time, he let Lejeune and Russo roam freely around the house. After feeding him food laced with Rohypnol, Dutroux placed hose clamps around Weinstein's testicles until Weinstein told him where his money was hidden. Dutroux then  buried Weinstein alive on his (Dutroux's) property in Sars-la-Buissière. On 6 December 1995, Dutroux, having been recognised by Rochow, was arrested for vehicle theft. 

According to Dutroux and Martin, Lejeune and Russo were still alive in the house at the time of Dutroux's arrest in December 1995, and Dutroux had ordered Martin to leave new food and water for the girls in the dungeon each time they ran out. Martin neglected to feed them, later claiming she was too afraid to go into the dungeon. Lejeune and Russo eventually starved to death. Dutroux initially stated that they were still alive when he returned home following his release from prison on 20 March 1996; according to him, Lejeune died that day, and Russo followed suit four days later despite his efforts to save her; during his trial, he said they were already dead when he returned from prison. An expert asserted that they would not have been able to survive the entire time Dutroux was in prison on the total amount of food and water they were said to have been given. Dutroux buried Lejeune and Russo's bodies in the garden of the house he owned in Sars-la-Buissière, near to that of Weinstein.

On the morning of 28 May 1996, Dutroux and Lelièvre kidnapped 12-year-old Sabine Dardenne, who was cycling to school in Tournai. In a book originally published under the title J'avais 12 ans, j'ai pris mon vélo et je suis partie à l'école (and published in the United Kingdom under the title I Choose to Live), Dardenne described her time in captivity in Dutroux's Marcinelle home, where she spent most of the time imprisoned in the dungeon and was starved and repeatedly raped by Dutroux. On 9 August 1996, Dutroux and Lelièvre kidnapped 14-year-old Laëtitia Delhez as she was walking home from her local swimming pool in Bertrix. An eyewitness observed Dutroux's van, described it and was able to identify part of the license plate. On 13 August 1996, Dutroux, Martin and Lelièvre were arrested. An initial search of Dutroux's houses proved inconclusive, but two days later, Dutroux and Lelièvre both made confessions. That same day, Dutroux led the police to the basement dungeon inside which Dardenne and Delhez were imprisoned; the girls were subsequently rescued. On 17 August 1996, Dutroux led police to his house in Sars-la-Buissière and, with his help, they were able to locate and exhume the bodies of Lejeune, Russo and Weinstein. On 3 September, the remains of Marchal and Lambrecks were located and exhumed in Jumet. Hundreds of commercial adult pornographic videos, along with a large number of home-made sex films that Dutroux had made with Martin, were recovered from his properties.

Errors during investigation

Failure to follow up on letter from Dutroux's mother warning of kidnapped girls being held at his house 
In 1995, Dutroux's mother wrote a letter to the authorities stating that she knew that Dutroux had kidnapped two girls and was keeping them at his house.

Failure to rescue Lejeune and Russo 
After Lejeune and Russo were kidnapped in June 1995, it took police 14 months to arrest Dutroux, although he had been a prime suspect from the start, having committed similar crimes before. During the search for Lejeune and Russo, police visited Dutroux's house, where Lejeune and Russo were held, twice, on 13 and 19 December 1995. However, no attempts were made to free them, even though the locksmith who accompanied police officer René Michaux said that he had heard the screams of children coming from inside the house. The locksmith reportedly said, "I'm not leaving before we turn the place upside down. The screams are clearly coming from inside the house," to which Michaux replied, "Who is the police officer here? You or me?"

Dutroux's arrest on car theft charges 
Marc Dutroux was arrested on 6 December 1995 on car theft charges and subsequently jailed for four months. During those three months, Lejeune and Russo, undiscovered by police, died of starvation and dehydration in their dungeon cell, as the wife of Dutroux did not feed them, despite being aware that they required her care to remain alive.

Failure to review video tapes confiscated from Dutroux 
During the search of the houses of Dutroux, about a hundred video tapes were found. They were never looked at. Some of them showed Dutroux constructing the dungeon in which Lejeune and Russo were held. Had police looked at them, they might have found the dungeon containing Lejeune and Russo. The video tapes had been in the possession of the police since December 1995. They had been passed on to the prosecutors in the case, but not to the judges. Furthermore, some of the video tapes were returned to Dutroux by police officer René Michaux without ever being looked at.

Michel Bourlet, who was appointed lead investigator, said that some of the video tapes had disappeared and that he wanted to have them all recovered and reviewed.

The videos were reportedly stolen after they were returned to Dutroux. In 1999 some of the tapes were finally reviewed. One of them showed Dutroux raping a young woman in Slovakia. The videos could have made it possible to identify other victims and also to determine the severity of the torture that the victims had to endure during their ordeal.

Later during the trial, the lawyer of one of the victims, Laetitia Delhez, also expressed disappointment that the videos were not reviewed, because they could have proved that Dutroux was not acting alone.

Brief escape from prison 
On 23 April 1998, Dutroux was allowed to view his case files. He was accompanied by two police officers. When one officer went on a break, Dutroux overpowered the other officer and was able to escape. He was captured a few hours later. The Minister of Justice, Stefaan De Clerck, the Minister of the Interior, Johan Vande Lanotte, and the police chief resigned as a result. In 2000, Dutroux received a five-year sentence for threatening a police officer during his escape. In 2002, he received another five-year sentence for unrelated crimes.

Failure to analyse DNA from basement dungeon 
Thousands of hairs were found in the cellar dungeon where Lejeune and Russo were held. However, those were not tested for DNA until 2001.

Inquiry into officer De Baets's handling of the police investigation 
An inquiry began into the handling of the investigation by officer De Baets. This inquiry  monopolised resources; during the inquiry, it was not possible for De Baets to pass on information to the Parliamentary inquiry into the handling of the case; crucial time was lost.

There were accusations that language difficulties obscured the investigation. The testimony of Régina Louf was in Dutch; however, it was reviewed several times by the new investigators, who were primarily French-speaking; they had difficulties in understanding her, resulting in the meaning of her testimony being altered to make her sound less credible.

Failure to properly investigate leads to Slovakia and Czech Republic 
Several sources had said that Michel Nihoul and Marc Dutroux were planning a prostitution and human trafficking operation between Slovakia, the Czech Republic and western Europe. Several other pieces of evidence pointed to connections to Slovakia and the Czech Republic. This included a video tape of Dutroux raping a child in Slovakia that police failed to review after it was seized. The car theft and smuggling operation that Dutroux was involved in pointed to those two Eastern European countries. At the time of his arrest, Dutroux was in possession of 2,000 SKK in cash. Six Belgian investigators visited the Czech Republic and Slovakia in August 1996. It was not seen to be possible for them to prove that Dutroux had committed any crimes while there, and they returned to Belgium without any substantial evidence.

Accusations of cover-up 
Many Belgians came to believe that Dutroux was part of a paedophile network which included high-ranking members of the Belgian establishment and that the other people involved were never prosecuted.

Judge Jean-Marc Connerotte's removal 
In October 1996, judge Jean-Marc Connerotte was removed from the investigation, ostensibly due to concerns of his impartiality after he attended a fund-raising dinner for the victims' families. Press reports claimed that, prior to his removal, Connerotte was on the verge of publicly disclosing the names of high level government officials who had been recognized on video-tapes. Connerotte had said that the businessman Michel Nihoul was the brains behind the child kidnapping operation. Investigators also believed that Dutroux and Nihoul were planning on a long-distance prostitution trafficking network involving cars and the import of girls from Slovakia.

The investigating police said in 1996, that Dutroux was part of a child-prostitution ring, that may also have been responsible for several other disappearances still unsolved. They also said that the gang around Dutroux offered $5000 per girl they received. Their criminal activities also involved car theft and smuggling. The car in which Lejeune and Russo were kidnapped was never found. The general prosecutor, Anne Thilly, decided to have the car theft and smuggling be investigated by different police authorities in different parts of the country. In this way it was nearly impossible to investigate the connection between the car theft, kidnapping and human trafficking. According to blogger Elizabeth Vos, writing in Consortium News, Dutroux also said that Nihoul had proposed to traffic girls from Eastern countries.

Michel Lelièvre, the accomplice of Marc Dutroux, said that the two girls, Lejeune and Russo, were kidnapped as an order by a third party. However, while under arrest, Lelièvre stopped cooperating with the authorities. He told police that he had been threatened and could not risk saying any more.

The father of Mélissa Russo, Gino Russo, said during the White March that the removal of judge Connerotte was like "spitting on the grave of Julie and Mélissa." Russo subsequently said that after Connerotte was removed there was no progress in the investigation.

Dutroux's wealth and assets 
Dutroux owned ten houses. He was in total worth 6 million Belgian francs (US$130,000). While he had all of this wealth in property he also received public assistance of $1,200 a month. It is not clear how Dutroux was able to acquire the ten properties. Documents released by WikiLeaks show that large sums of money in different currencies arrived in Michelle Martin's bank account, linked in time to the disappearances of the abducted girls. According to Elizabeth Vos, the money was also transferred in foreign currencies from Morocco and Saudi Arabia. Both the transfers and the value of the six properties that Dutroux owned suggested to investigators that he was financed by a larger pedophile and prostitution ring. The Flemish newspaper Nieuwsblad reported that he had committed health-insurance fund fraud, theft, insurance fraud and investments on the stock market and that these had contributed to his wealth.

Other outlets suggested that he was able to acquire his wealth through criminal activity such as drug-trafficking and mugging. Additional sources said that he made a lot of money with car theft and pimping.

Claims by the victims' families 
Paul Marchal, the father of the murdered An Marchal, accused the police and the judicial system of a cover-up in 2001. He was angry that still in 2001 the trial had not started even though Dutroux had been under arrest for several years. Marchal said: "It feels like they don't want to find the truth. It is not a good feeling and not only I think this."

Carine Russo and her husband Gino Russo were not permitted to identify their daughter and look at her body. They were told by authorities that Dutroux had identified her and that that was enough. The autopsy of Mélissa showed that she had been raped repeatedly over a prolonged period of time. No DNA evidence was taken from the body to conclusively make sure that only Dutroux had raped her. Dutroux always denied raping Mélissa and Julie.

Eventually several families of victims boycotted the official trial, stating that it was a circus and there had been no progress in the case since the removal of judge Connerotte.

Failure to test DNA 
There were countless hairs found in the dungeon where the two girls were held. Judge Langlois refused to have them tested for DNA evidence even though the leading police investigator, Michel Bourlet, had begged him to have them analyzed in order to know whether more people beside Dutroux were involved. The general prosecutor of the case, Anne Thily, said that she did not believe there was anyone else involved and thus did not have the samples analyzed. Thily told investigative journalist Olenka Frenkiel, "In any case the hairs have all now been analysed—all 5,000. And the results of this analysis? Nothing. No evidence of any relevance in the Dutroux affair. Which proves, of course, that Langlois was right all along." According to Frenkiel, this was not true. Frenkiel accused senior prosecutor Thily of lying brazenly. Frenkiel continued to question Thily and asked her how she would want to prove that Dutroux raped the girls, as he was denying it and there was no DNA evidence. Thily then replied that there were DNA tests, but that the results came back inconclusive as the bodies were too decomposed at the time the samples were taken. Dutroux's lawyer, Xavier Magnee, said during the trial proceedings "I speak not only as a lawyer, but also as a citizen and father. He was not the only devil. Out of the 6000 hair samples that were found in the basement cellar where some of the victims were held, 25 "unknown" DNA profiles were discovered. There were people in that cellar that are not now accused." The prosecution never attempted to match those DNA profiles to people implicated in the case.

Cult assertions 

Magnee also asserted that the prosecutors did not follow up on evidence pointing to a cult called "Abrasax", which allegedly performed human sacrifices. In a wooden house owned by Bernard Weinstein, a letter was found from the occult sect "Abrasax", in which a gift for Dominique Kindermans, the high priestress, was mentioned, consisting of 17 girls between the age of 2 and 20 for anal, oral and vaginal sex. It was signed by priest "Anubis". This priest was later identified as Francis De Smedt. Later investigations showed that four policemen in Charleroi were also members of the sect; one was even the treasurer. The headquarters of Institut Abrasax in Rue Emile Vandervelde 223 Forchies La Marche was raided in 1996 by 150 officers. Video of the raid showed police taking away bags of papers, video cassettes and a refrigerator. They also took away black magic ritual implements and human skulls.

Removal of police officers 
Several police officers who had worked on the case were subsequently removed from the case in 1997. They were reportedly removed because they had manipulated evidence surrounding the testimony of Régina Louf. The involved officers always denied that accusation. This included officer Rudi Hoskens, who believed that the testimony of witness X1, Régina Louf, was true because her testimony matched an unsolved murder case that she could have had no knowledge of, had she not witnessed it. What she described was the murder of then 15-year-old Christine van Hees. She said that the girl was tortured to death by the group and that Nihoul took part in the torture. She said Dutroux watched. Christine van Hees's body was found in 1984. The officer leading the investigation, De Baets, stated that they followed up on all testimonies the X witnesses had given, in order to determine whether what they said was possible or not, and that they came to the conclusion that it was possible that the things had occurred as the witnesses described them. As this took up a lot of resources and time of the police force, an inquiry was initiated into the handling of the case, which then again took up as many resources as the investigation of De Baets itself. It was said that:"The suspicion grew that De Baets and others formed part of a sect bent on destabilising the kingdom." De Baets and large parts of his team were removed from the investigation and sent home on indefinite leave. Not only was De Baets dropped from the investigation, but he was also charged in 1997 with concealing the fact that Louf had wrongly identified the photograph of one of the victims. However, on the videotapes of her interrogation, it is visible that it was very hard for her to stand looking at the photographs and that her right answer had been in the files all along. In 1999, De Baets was exonerated from the charges. Additionally, two journalists from Le Soir, who were judged to have defamed him and four colleagues, were ordered to pay the gendarmes 2.2 million Belgian francs ($55,000), plus costs. Even though De Baets had been exonerated, he and his colleagues remained on leave.

Promotion of René Michaux, who failed to save Lejeune and Russo 
An officer searched Dutroux's house while Lejeune and Russo were likely still alive on 13 and 19 December 1995. Although the locksmith who inspected the house with him suggested they should search the whole house to find out where children's screams were coming from, Michaux left after not having searched the house thoroughly. Not only did Michaux fail to rescue Lejeune and Russo, he also failed to ever look at video tapes that were confiscated from Dutroux's house. Those video tapes showed him constructing the dungeon, which would have led them to the place where Lejeune and Russo had been kept. Some of the videos also included tapes of Dutroux raping women. Many of the tapes were returned to Dutroux without ever being looked at by law enforcement.

Even though Michaux committed grave failures in his duty as a police officer in what was one of the most important criminal cases in the history of Belgium, he was never removed or put on leave like other officers had been. According to Vos, he was subsequently promoted to the position of police commissioner.

Arrests of law enforcement personnel believed to be connected to Dutroux 
At least seven members of law enforcement were arrested on suspicion of having ties to Marc Dutroux. One of them was Georges Zico, a police detective believed to be an associate of Dutroux. According to prosecutor Michel Bourlet, Zico was charged with truck theft, document forgery and insurance fraud.

Judge Jean-Claude Van Espens's close ties to suspect Michel Nihoul 
The judge presiding over the Dutroux case, Judge Jean-Claude Van Espen, had a close relationship with Michel Nihoul. A journalist revealed that, while he was a lawyer, Van Espen had represented the wife of Nihoul. Van Espen's sister was the godmother of Nihoul's child. However, even though his close friend Michel Nihoul was involved in the case, Van Espen never resigned. He was also not removed from the case for a very long time, even though judge Conerotte had been removed simply for attending a fundraising dinner. Van Espen was furthermore the judge presiding over the murder case of Christine van Hees from 1984. He resigned from the Dutroux case only in 1998, when Nihoul was accused of being involved in the murder and Van Espen's close ties to Nihoul were revealed.

Testimony of Judge Jean-Marc Connerotte in court 
Connerotte testified in the Dutroux case on 4 March 2004. He broke down in the witness box stating that there had been high-level murder plots to stop his investigation into the child-sex mafia. He stated that he had to drive in bullet-proof cars and had armed guards around him at all times because shadowy figures from the crime world were threatening him. The police had informed him that murder contracts had been taken out against the prosecutors in the case. He alleged that organised crime methods were used to discredit his work and make sure that the investigation would end in a judicial failure.

Connerotte criticised authorities for not rescuing Lejeune and Russo, even though Dutroux had been a prime suspect for one year before they were found dead. Connerotte also said that he had received files describing a child-sex network. It described seizure of children and foreign trafficking. The sum of 150,000 francs was mentioned as the price for a girl. Connerotte also said that he was doubtful of the official explanation on how Lejeune and Russo died. It was said that they starved to death in the dungeon. An adult can last about three days without water and maximum 60 days without food. If they received nothing to drink and eat they should have been dead very soon after Dutroux was imprisoned. However, Michelle Martin insisted that they were still alive when he returned. Connerotte had even written to King Albert II of Belgium in 1996, stating that his investigations into crime networks were being blocked because suspects "received serious protection". The judge said that the "dysfunctional judiciary" was breaking down as mafia groups took secret control of the "key institutions of the country".

Letter of Judge Jean-Marc Connerotte to King Albert II 
A letter from Connerotte addressed to King Albert II in 1996 stated: "This institution seems to acquire its authority and supremacy over sectors of the justice system by relying on a complex and secret modus operandi, that of the appropriation of certain key circuits of our institutions created and regulated by the Law. It is a matter essentially of political, financial, police, and media circuits. This mafia-style criminal phenomenon is evidently not peculiar to Belgium, but it involves particular manifestations that are well suited to this small country. We can imagine the obstacles that a judiciary inquiry will meet when investigating such facts: numerous taboos, problems of mentality, and a lack of cultural reference on the issue in order to be able to become aware of or deal with such criminal phenomena, taking advantage in Belgium of official reticence in terms of their acknowledgement, which favours or supports their occultation. The function of a criminal system of this sort is obviously to serve its fundamental purpose, the pursuance of particularly profitable illicit activities, such as money-laundering, and to protect the 'legitimacy' of its activities and the impunity of its agents. This indispensable function corresponds to the motive of criminal protection that assures the permanency of the incriminated system by means of the infiltration of the certain circuits of our institutions, especially the police force, a veritable 'knot' which my whole investigation has come up against."

Book by chairman of the parliamentary inquiry Marc Verwilghen 
Marc Verwilghen, the chairman of the parliamentary inquiry into the handling of the Dutroux case, reported attempts in a book he published in 1999 to stifle their investigation into how the case had been handled. Verwilghen eventually published a book that claimed that the commission's findings had been muzzled by political and judicial leaders to prevent the revelation of details that would have implicated the complicity of additional perpetrators. Verwilghen claimed that senior political and legal figures refused to cooperate with the inquiry. He said magistrates and police were officially told to refuse to answer certain questions, in what he described as 'a characteristic smothering operation'. Verwilghen blamed Langlois for refusing to hand over evidence of official protection for Dutroux. He said that if they had received that information, their report would have been without doubt more precise and detailed. Verwilghen added that for him, the Dutroux affair was a question of organised crime.

Statements by Senator Anne-Marie Lizin 
The Belgian Senator Anne-Marie Lizin commented on the case saying: "Stupidity (by the police) can't be the only explanation. It's a question of stupidity, incompetence and corruption. Dutroux must be a friend of somebody important. Or else he was being protected because he was known to be a police informant." Lizin said Dutroux was not a true pedophile, as he has been portrayed. He had a record of dealing in stolen cars, selling arms to hoodlums and trafficking in prostitution. "When he discovered that men paid a lot more for little girls for prostitution, he started kidnapping them," she said. When Dutroux finally was arrested, police found in his house video films of him raping little girls. They said he did this so he could sell the films to pedophiles.

Attempts to have access to Dutroux Dossier from WikiLeaks blocked in Belgium 
In 2009 WikiLeaks published the Dutroux Dossier. Belgian authorities tried to have the dossier taken down. The prosecutor general of Liege, Cedric Visart de Bocarme, said "There is some true, some false, some very disparate information here, involving some people who have done nothing wrong, who have simply been mentioned in an investigation and are thus exposed to public contempt, whereas all this material should have remained classified."

Deaths of potential witnesses 
More than 20 potential witnesses in the case have died in mysterious circumstances.

Other deaths of people associated with the case

Parliamentary investigation and escape from custody 
A 17-month investigation by a parliamentary commission into the Dutroux affair produced a report in February 1998, which concluded that while Dutroux did not have accomplices in high positions in the police and justice systems, as he continued to claim, he profited from corruption, sloppiness and incompetence.

Public outcry 
In October 1996, more than 300,000 Belgians marched through the streets of Brussels after judge Jean-Marc Connerotte was removed from the case. He was removed for attending a fundraising dinner for the families of the victims, which the court system claimed damaged his impartiality. They demanded an investigation and reform of the police and justice system. The protest was called the "White March". Connerotte was beloved by the public because the only two surviving victims were rescued on his initiative, which made him a national hero. Protesters were wearing signs that said "Stop the cover-up".

To protest the prospect of a conditional release of Dutroux, a "Black March" was organised on the 23rd anniversary of the "White March". The calls to take part in the march were made after it was made public that a court had approved the request of Michel Lelièvre for conditional release, who was an accomplice of Dutroux and had received a 25-year sentence.

The Guardian reported in 2004 that "the entire credibility of the current reformist government of Guy Verhofstadt and Belgium's very reputation as a normal civilised country is on the line."

The crimes of Marc Dutroux were covered in multiple nonfiction documentaries, one of the earliest being a British public-access TV documentary titled Witness: The Lost Children (Channel 4, 1999, directed by Helen Hill), which was narrated by Stephen Rashbrook and featured interviews with multiple family members of the victims, as well as with Claude Thirault, a next-door neighbour of Dutroux's who had later become a police informant after raising personal suspicions about Dutroux's activities, which had included watching small children from the street, and also being caught digging up under water tanks in an old basement, creating a space where Thirault claimed that Dutroux had planned to use for hiding children in. An episode of Crimes That Shook the World titled "Monster of Belgium" (Season 2, Episode 9, April 2009) was aired later on by Discovery Channel, bringing North American attention to the Belgium case.

Assassination of André Cools 
The assassination of André Cools took place in 1991. The revelations in the Cools case coincided with the revelations in the Dutroux case and in total made the Belgian public lose trust in their government. Van der Biest was eventually convicted but had already been investigated five years prior as the one who ordered the contract hit on Cools. Due to failures in the investigation he was not charged. It was found that several Belgian politicians had been bribed with large sums of money by an Italian helicopter manufacturer, Agusta, in exchange for military contracts. This included Belgian secretary general of NATO, Willy Claes. There were allegations that both the assassination of Cools and the case surrounding Dutroux showed that organised crime had spread in Belgium and that the institutions were not efficient in combatting the spread or corruption and organised crime.

Trial 
Dutroux's trial began on 1 March 2004, some seven and a half years after his initial arrest. It was a trial by jury and up to 450 people were called upon to testify. The trial took place in Arlon, the capital of the Belgian province of Luxembourg, where the investigations had started. Dutroux was tried for the murders of An Marchal, Eefje Lambrecks and Bernard Weinstein. Dutroux was also charged with a host of other crimes: auto theft, abduction, attempted murder and attempted abduction, molestation, and three unrelated rapes of women from Slovakia.

Martin was tried as an accomplice, as were Lelièvre and Michel Nihoul. To protect the accused, they were made to sit in a glass cage during the trial. In the first week of the trial, photos of Dutroux's face were not allowed to be printed in Belgian newspapers for privacy reasons; this ban remained in force until 9 March. 

In a rare move, the jury at the assizes trial publicly protested the presiding judge Stéphane Goux's handling of the debates and the victims' testimonies. On 14 June 2004, after three months of trial, the jury went into seclusion to reach their verdicts on Dutroux and the three other accused. Verdicts were returned on 17 June 2004 after three days of deliberation. Dutroux, Martin and Lelièvre were found guilty on all charges; the jury were unable to reach a verdict on Nihoul's role.

Dutroux's testimony 
Dutroux claimed that he was a low dog in a powerful pedophile network. He further claimed that Michel Nihoul was the organizer of their abductions." While admitting some abductions, he denied being a murderer, although he had earlier confessed to killing Weinstein. He said that he did torture and abuse all of the girls but denied killing any of them until the very end. Dutroux further denied the kidnapping, raping and murdering Julie Lejeune and Mélissa Russo. He, however, admitted to incarcerating them at one of his houses.   In the case of Lejeune and Russo, Dutroux also claimed that he had "protected them from a powerful and sinister child sex ring." His testimony that he never raped Lejeune and Russo was somewhat supported by examinations by psychiatrists in 1996, which stated that Dutroux did not fit the pedophile profile. He was not attracted to children, but he might have chosen to abduct younger victims because they were easier to manipulate and control.
Dutroux admitted to abduction and rape of the other girls. He also admitted to burying his accomplice, Bernard Weinstein, alive for "letting the girls die." Dutroux further said that two unidentified policemen had taken part with him in the kidnapping of An Marchal and Eefje Lambrecks. He boasted about having built the dungeon in which Marchal and Lambrecks were held for a while. He said: "I wanted to create a hiding place to spare them from being sent to a prostitution ring." Dutroux admitted to raping Lambrecks. He said that Weinstein had raped Marchal. He also admitted to drugging both of them. Dutroux also admitted that he kidnapped Sabine Dardenne and raped her. He admitted to kidnapping and raping Laetitia Delhez but not handing them over to Nihoul "to spare them the fate of An and Eefje." Dutroux's lawyer, Xavier Magnee, repeatedly said that the prosecution never followed up on evidence of a network surrounding Dutroux.

Michelle Martin's testimony 
Martin testified that Dutroux and Weinstein kidnapped Lejeune and Russo. She also said that Dutroux had told her that he had murdered Weinstein. Martin further said that Dutroux and Weinstein had killed Marchal and Lambrecks. She further testified that Lejeune and Russo starved to death in their basement in 1996 while Dutroux was in jail. She claims that she was too scared to descend to the basement.

Martin said that Dutroux had already decided to abduct girls in 1985. He had said that it was easier to abduct and rape girls than having to start affairs with them. This way he would also have more resources and time to spend on her. So she had to help him with the abductions.

The X files 
The X files were testimonies of people who claimed to have been victims of Dutroux. They had been created after judge Jean-Marc Connerotte had made a public appeal for victims to come forward. In total at least ten victims subsequently contacted the police. All of the witnesses were given the code name "X number". One of the witnesses' names, namely X1, was revealed to be Régina Louf. X1 said that from the age of 11/12 onwards a family friend named Tony Van den Bogaert took her to sex parties with the approval of her family. Several witnesses and family members of Louf confirmed that she had a sexual relationship with Van den Bogaert starting from at least age 12. However, Van den Bogaert has never been interrogated, charged or convicted for sexual abuse. She claimed that other minors were present at the sex parties and that those were secretly filmed for blackmail purposes. She said: "It was highly organised. Big business. Blackmail. There was a lot of money involved." During her testimony she described some regular clients including judges, a prominent politician and one banker. She gave the police names, addresses and detailed description of two murders that matched unsolved cases of the two murders of teenage girls. Louf said that the parties did not only include sex but also sadism, torture and murder. She claimed that one of the organisers of the parties was a man she knew as Mich (Jean Michel Nihoul). Louf described him as a cruel man, who sadistically tortured girls.

Louf said that Dutroux was at that time a young man who brought drugs to the parties for the girls to numb themselves and took care of them in other ways. As a reward he was also allowed to use them for his pleasure. The crimes that Louf described took place about ten years prior to the arrest of Dutroux. Louf's full name was leaked to the press. She was subsequently made out to look like a fantasist and liar. The new presiding judges declared that she was not a credible witness and that her testimony and the testimony of the other X witnesses would not be used during the trial.

One of the other X witnesses, whose real name was not revealed, but who's now working for the police, said that they had witnessed and experienced similar abuse. They also recounted instances where children were chased through the woods with Dobermans.

Witness X3 testified that one of the people present at the gatherings that involved sex orgies with minors, torture and murder was Willy Claes, secretary general of the NATO. Claes resigned after he was found guilty of corruption in a tendering process for a large defence contract connected to Agusta helicopters, a large military-helicopter producer from Italy.

The testimony of X2 implicated that Etienne Davignon, Maurice Lippens, Paul Vanden Boeynants, Benoît de Bonvoisin and Prince Alexandre of Saxe-Coburg-Gotha were named as having been present at orgies involving underaged persons.

A book was published in November 1999 titled: The X-Files: What Belgium Was Not Supposed to Know About the Dutroux Affair. It was written by two journalists from the Flemish Belgian newspaper De Morgen, Annemie Bulte and Douglas De Coninck and another journalist from the French Belgian newspaper Journal du Mardi, Marie-Jeanne Van Heeswyck. It claimed that the X witnesses were much more believable than stated by the media. But it also stated that there had been substantial efforts by the magistrates and senior police officials to demolish the testimony of the X-witnesses. The father of a police officer that was murdered while investigating a car smuggling ring, Judge Guy Poncelet, said that the book was brilliant and convincing. He said he believed that crucial evidence had been downplayed by the authorities.

Sentencing 
The death penalty was abolished in Belgium in 1996. The last execution for common-law crimes was in 1918. However, the majority of Belgians, at the time of the trial, would have had no problem with Dutroux receiving the death penalty. On 22 June 2004, Dutroux received the maximum sentence of life imprisonment, while Martin received 30 years and Lelièvre 25 years. The jury was asked to go back into seclusion to decide whether or not Nihoul was an accomplice.

On 23 June, Dutroux lodged an appeal against his sentence.

Although Nihoul was acquitted of kidnapping and conspiracy charges, he was convicted on drug-related charges and was sentenced to five years' imprisonment. Nihoul was released in spring 2006. He resided in Zeebrugge until his death on 23 October 2019.

On 19 August 2012, about 2,000 people in Brussels demonstrated against Martin's possible early release from prison. She has since been paroled, 16 years into her sentence, and was released into the care of the Poor Clares in Malonne. She was given shelter, although she was not part of the community. The sisters have declared that they were not her guardian and shelter was given under the condition that she would not violate the conditions of her parole. As the convent has since been sold, she has had to find new shelter or go back to prison. A former judge has created an apartment in his converted farmhouse, where she now lives.

Lelièvre is currently serving his prison sentence in the prison of Ittre. His application for parole in 2013 was denied. He has since then been granted temporary leave, but has violated the conditions of release. He may be released if he can find an apprenticeship as a cabinet-maker, which has so far been unsuccessful. The Belgian state was forced to pay Lelièvre €6,000. The European Court of Human Rights ruled that a moral compensation was in order because he was held in custody (nearly eight years) without receiving answers to his requests.

On 4 February 2013, Dutroux requested the court in Brussels for an early release from prison. He insisted that he was "no longer dangerous" and wanted to be released into house arrest with an electronic tag (ankle bracelet) placed upon him. On 18 February, the court denied his request.
Dutroux is currently being held in solitary confinement in the prison of Nivelles.

In October 2019, Dutroux won the pre-parole right to a psychiatric assessment, which was supposed to take place in May 2020 but was delayed due to the COVID-19 pandemic.

Michel Nihoul 
Michel Nihoul was a businessman known to frequently attend sex parties. He was accused of being the brains behind the child kidnapping and abuse operation around Dutroux. According to Vos, Nihoul was charged in relation to the case with "kidnapping, rape, conspiracy and drug offenses." Nihoul's lawyer in the case, Frederic Clement de Clety, denied all charges made against Nihoul by Dutroux and called him a "liar and manipulator." When the investigative journalist Olenka Frenkiel met Nihoul in Brussels, he reportedly greeted her with the words "I am the monster of Belgium." He told her that he was certain that he would never be prosecuted. During the encounter he grabbed her, tickled her and pulled her onto him so that she called for her colleagues to help her get away from him. Frenkiel was working on a documentary on the case for the BBC. In 2004 at the end of the Dutroux case trial he was released of all charges of child abduction. In May 2010 the Belgian prosecutor's office dropped all charges against Nihoul relating to a participation to a pedophile ring in the absence of any tangible evidence.

Judges 
 Jean-Marc Connerotte (on his initiative two girls were rescued, was removed from case for attending fundraising dinner for families)
 Jacques Langlois (investigating magistrate). Dutroux case was his first assignment
 Stephane Goux (judge presiding over verdict)
 Jean-Claude Van Espen (was in charge of the murder investigation of Christine van Hees, resigned from the Dutroux case and the murder investigation around van Hees after his close ties to Michel Nihoul were made public in 1998)

Effects in Belgium 
The Dutroux case is so infamous that more than a third of Belgians with the surname "Dutroux" applied to have their surname changed between 1996 and 1998.

Confirmed victims of Dutroux 
 Sylvie D., 11, 17 October 1985, abducted and raped
 Maria V., 19, 17 October 1985, abducted and raped
 Catherine B., 18, 17 January 1986, abducted and raped
 Élisabeth G., 15, 18 December 1985, abducted and raped. Dutroux took videos and pictures of her
 Axelle D., 14 December 1985, abducted and raped
 Mélissa Russo, 8, 24 June 1995, abducted and imprisoned. Died of starvation and dehydration, found in Sars-la-Buissiere
 Julie Lejeune, 8, 24 June 1995, abducted and imprisoned. Died of starvation and dehydration, found in Sars-la-Buissiere
 An Marchal, 17, 23 August 1995, abducted, imprisoned, and raped. Killed by being buried alive after being wrapped in plastic, found August 1996
 Eefje Lambrecks, 19, 23 August 1995, abducted, imprisoned, and raped. Killed by being buried alive after being wrapped in plastic, found August 1996
 Sabine Dardenne, 12, 28 May 1996, abducted, chained by neck for 79 days, and raped repeatedly, according to Vos
 Laetitia Delhez, 14, 9 August 1996, abducted, chained to bed, and raped for four days

Dutroux's houses 
Marc Dutroux owned seven houses, four of which he used for his kidnappings:
 The house on the Route de Philippeville 128 in Marcinelle is most often cited in the media. All victims were held captive here in the basement and bedroom. The municipality of Charleroi seized ownership of this house, because of what happened there and the bad state of the house. There are plans to create an open space with a memorial site here. In the Belgian procedure of compulsory purchase, an owner has a last right to visit a house. Therefore, Dutroux visited this house on 10 September 2009, under heavy police guard. Demolition of this house started at June 6, 2022. A commemorative garden will be built in its place.
 A house in Jumet, that has since been demolished. The remains of An Marchal and Eefje Lambrecks were found buried in the garden of this house. Bernard Weinstein lived in this house for a while. A small monument is placed at this location.
 A house in Marchienne-au-Pont. Julie Lejeune and Mélissa Russo were held captive here for a short while after their kidnapping.
 A house in Sars-la-Buissière. The bodies of Lejeune, Russo and Weinstein were found buried in the garden. The house was bought by the municipality of Lobbes in the first months of 2009. It is planned to make a park with a monument commemorating Dutroux's victims here.

Chronology of the case

Previous crimes 
 26 April 1989 – Marc Dutroux is convicted of the rape of five girls in 1985 and 1986.
 8 April 1992 – Dutroux, thanks to the then minister of justice Melchior Wathelet, is released from prison early where he was serving a 13.5 year sentence.

Main crimes and arrests 
 24 June 1995 – The eight-year-old girls Julie Lejeune and Mélissa Russo are abducted in Liège.
 22 August 1995 – The 17-year-old An Marchal and the 19-year-old Eefje Lambrecks are kidnapped in Ostend.
 25 November 1995 – The 43-year-old Bernard Weinstein was killed by Dutroux (presumably on this date).
 13 December 1995 – Following tips from witnesses and Dutroux's mother, Chief Guard René Michaux searches Dutroux 's house in Marcinelle. Children's voices are heard, but Michaux thinks that they come from outside.
 28 May 1996 – 12-year-old Sabine Dardenne is abducted in Kain, Walloon.
 9 August 1996 – Laetitia Delhez, 14, is abducted in Bertrix.
 13 August 1996 – Dutroux, his wife Michelle Martin, and a friend, Michel Lelièvre, are arrested on the basis of witness statements.
 15 August 1996 – Police discovered Sabine Dardenne and Laetitia Delhez, who were hidden in a cell in the basement of Dutroux's house.
 16 August 1996 – Police arrest Michel Nihoul on suspicion of conspiracy.
 17 August 1996 – The bodies of Lejeune and Russo are dug up in the garden of a house that Dutroux owns in Sars-la-Buissière. The girls died of starvation. The corpse of Bernard Weinstein, a French companion of Dutroux, is also discovered in the same garden.
 18 August 1996 – Dutroux and Lelièvre confess the kidnapping of Marchal and Lambrecks, but deny that the teenagers were murdered.
 3 September 1996 – The police find the bodies of Marchal and Lambrecks under a shed at Weinstein's house. They were buried alive.

Investigation 
 21 September 1996 – Jean-Marc Connerotte, investigating judge in the Dutroux case, marries his girlfriend with whom he has been together for 10 years. Together with their son they visit a benefit meeting for the parents of (the) disappeared children. They eat spaghetti during this benefit meeting. Connerotte sat at the table with Michel Bourlet, the attorney at Neufchâteau. He stayed for only an hour and did not speak to Sabine Dardenne. The magistrates received a fountain pen of €27 each, their wives a bouquet of flowers.
 15 October 1996 – The spaghetti judgement: the Court of Cassation removes the investigating judge Jean-Marc Connerotte because attending this benefit meeting where he received two gifts (the plate of spaghetti and a fountain pen).
 20 October 1996 – The White March. Around 300,000 people demonstrate in Brussels to vent their outrage at the delays and errors in the Dutroux investigation.
 24 October 1996 – Fearing that the Dutroux investigation will be screwed up, the Belgian parliament will set up an independent investigation committee to investigate the Dutroux case, as well as the possible procedural errors in the Belgian police and judicial authorities. Marc Verwilghen will be the chairman.
 15 March 1997 – The Dutroux commission makes scathing criticism of the police and the Ministry of Justice, who made a mess of investigations into the missing girls.
 6 May 1997 – The Dutroux Commission returns to work and investigates whether Dutroux was protected by high figures.
 15 February 1998 – The committee's second report states that the Dutroux gang did not enjoy protection from above, but benefited from corruption, carelessness, and lack of professionalism.
 23 April 1998 – Dutroux escapes his guards in the Neufchâteau courthouse, but is picked up again four hours later in Herbeumont Saint-Médard by ranger Stéphane Michaux. Interior Minister Johan Vande Lanotte and Minister of Justice Stefaan De Clerck offer their resignation on the same day and are succeeded by Louis Tobback and Tony Van Parys, respectively. The head of the government service, Willy Deridder, also resigns.
 14 July 1999 - Hubert Massa, Advocate General in charge of the Dutroux case, commits suicide.
 15 December 1999 – Michel Nihoul is released conditionally due to lack of evidence.
 15 March 2002 – Investigative Judge Jacques Langlois completes the investigation into Dutroux.
 17 January 2003 – The Council Chamber in Neufchâteau decides to bring Dutroux, Martin and Lelièvre before the Court of Assisen. Nihoul is excluded from prosecution. Public prosecutor Bourlet and some civil parties file an appeal.
 30 April 2003 – The Liège Chamber of Indictment (AI) follows Attorney Bourlet and also refers Nihoul to the Court of Assisen.
 8 December 2003 – Attorney Bourlet files the 27-page indictment.

Trial 
 1 March 2004 – The Dutroux trial starts in Arlon.
 14 June 2004 – After 56 litigation days, the twelve members of the jury withdraw to consider the guilt or innocence of the suspects.
 17 June 2004 – Dutroux is found guilty of various murders.
 22 June 2004 – Dutroux is sentenced to life imprisonment and 10 years at the government's disposal. Michelle Martin gets 30 years in prison, Michel Lelièvre 25 years and Michel Nihoul 5 years. Dutroux appeals in cassation.
 16 December 2004 – The Court of Cassation decides that no procedural errors have been made. The penalties continue to apply.
 October 2005 – Lelièvre asks for a first time to be released conditionally. That is refused because he has not yet reimbursed his victims.
 Michel Nihoul was released early in May 2006 under conditions
 2007 – The Belgian state is ordered by the European Court of Human Rights to pay €6,000 in damages to Lelièvre, because his pre-trial detention had lasted unreasonably long. Like Marc Dutroux and Michelle Martin, Lelièvre had been in jail for almost eight years when he was convicted in 2004. The money goes to his victims.
 April 2007 – Michelle Martin submits a request for conditional release, in application of the Lejeune Act. This is rejected in view of the seriousness of the facts, the lack of probation prospects and the risks associated with the psychological profile of the convicted person.
 October 2008 – Martin submits a second application, which is rejected.
 November 2009 – Martin submits a third application, which is again rejected.
 8 May 2011 – Martin, after serving half of her sentence, obtains conditional release. The associated conditions were not met in mid-June 2011, and Martin was not released conditionally.
 April 2012 – Dutroux requests penal leave, allowing him to stay outside the prison for a day and a night every month (this can be done at the earliest one year before serving one third of his sentence). The prison management rejects.

Releases 
 31 July 2012 – The criminal court decides once again to release Michelle Martin conditionally. The monastery of the Poor Klaren in Malonne was prepared to receive her. However, the Public Prosecution Service appealed in cassation. The conditional release led to protests.
 19 August 2012 – The families of Julie Lejeune and An Marchal, together with Laetitia Delhez, organised a demonstration against Martin's conditional release. There were 5,000 participants. After the event, they were received by Minister of Justice Annemie Turtelboom and Minister of Internal Affairs Joëlle Milquet, a week later by Prime Minister Elio Di Rupo.
 28 August 2012 – The Supreme Court ruled that it had found no procedural errors in the decision of the criminal court. A few hours later Martin left the prison on the way to the monastery in Malonne.
 6 September 2012 – Following the protests against the release of Martin, the government summit finalised the coalition agreement that included a tightening of the conditional release.
 13 September 2012 – Dutroux applied for release with ankle strap (this can be done six months before the first appearance before the criminal court). According to Ronny Baudewijn, Dutroux's lawyer, he also strongly desired to be released. He declared to have spent hours discussing repentance and regret with him, which Dutroux does not have: He found it regrettable that people had died, but he did not feel guilty. As a psychopath, he cannot empathize with what he did to others, he only sees what he is entitled to.
 April 2013 – Dutroux will have served one third of his sentence and will be summoned for the first time by the enforcement court (even if he does not take the initiative with a request for a conditional release).
 October 2019 – Michael Lelièvre released under conditions 
 October 2019 – Dutroux filed to have himself be examined by psychiatrist. In order to be able to be released early under conditions in 2021, three psychiatrists would have to come to the conclusion that the danger of him reoffending is low. In May 2020, Dutroux's pre-parole hearing was delayed by the COVID-19 pandemic.

See also 
 Jean-Denis Lejeune
 Carine Russo
Alcàsser Girls
 List of prison escapes
 List of serial killers by country
 Moors murders
 Sachsensumpf
 Death of Katrien De Cuyper
 Regina Louf

References 
 Inline citations

 General references
The official indictment
BBC News on Sabine Dardenne
Dutroux at CrimeLibrary
United Nations High Commission on Human Rights report criticizing changes in the Belgian Constitution due to the case

External links 

 
1956 births
20th-century Belgian criminals
Belgian escapees
Belgian murderers of children
Belgian people convicted of child sexual abuse
Belgian people convicted of kidnapping
Belgian people convicted of murder
Belgian prisoners sentenced to life imprisonment
Belgian rapists
Belgian serial killers
Drug dealers
Living people
Male serial killers
People convicted of child pornography offenses
People convicted of murder by Belgium
People convicted of theft
People from Ixelles
People with antisocial personality disorder
Political scandals in Belgium
Prisoners sentenced to life imprisonment by Belgium
Scandals in Belgium
Walloon people